Paratrachea is a genus of moths of the family Noctuidae. The genus was erected by George Hampson in 1908.

Species
 Paratrachea laches (Druce, 1889)
 Paratrachea viridescens (Barnes & McDunnough, 1918)

References

Amphipyrinae